Handball at the Pan American Games began at the 1987 edition in Indianapolis, United States for both men and women. The 1991 edition of the Pan American Games, however, held only a men's handball competition.

Men's competition

Medal table (men)

Participation history (men)

Women's competition

Medal table (women)

Participation history (women)

Medal table

References

 
Handball
Pan American Games
Pan American Games
Pan American Games